Barbara Bush (1925–2018) was the wife of George H. W. Bush and the mother of George W. Bush.

Barbara Bush may also refer to:

Barbara Bush (born 1981), daughter of George W. Bush
Barbara Bush (diver) (born 1964), Canadian Olympic diver
Barbara Tyson (born 1964), Canadian actress sometimes billed as Barbara Bush

See also
Barbara Bush Middle School (Irving, Texas)